Endre Fotland Knudsen (born 9 July 1988) is a retired Norwegian football midfielder.

He joined Lyn in 2007 from the club's youth ranks, and in 2007, 2008 and 2009 he played 21 games and scored 4 goals in the Norwegian Premier League. He has also played for Norway national under-21 football team. Lyn went bankrupt in 2010, and Knudsen trained with Manglerud Star until joining Lyn Fotball in August. Following a stint in Røros IL in 2013–14 he returned to Lyn and played there through 2015.

References

1988 births
Living people
Norwegian footballers
Lyn Fotball players
Eliteserien players
Norwegian First Division players
Footballers from Oslo
Norway under-21 international footballers

Association football midfielders